State Road 121 (SR 121) is a part of the Indiana State Road that exists in two sections. The first  runs between Metamora and Connersville and the second from Richmond to the Ohio state line in US state of Indiana.  The  of SR 121 that lie within Indiana serve as a minor highway. None of the highway is listed on the National Highway System. The entire route is rural two-lane highway that passes through farmland, residential and commercial properties.

Route description
No segment of State Road 121 in Indiana is included in the National Highway System (NHS).  The NHS is a network of highways that are identified as being most important for the economy, mobility and defense of the nation. The highway is maintained by the Indiana Department of Transportation (INDOT) like all other state roads in the state. The department tracks the traffic volumes along all state roads as a part of its maintenance responsibilities using a metric called average annual daily traffic (AADT). This measurement is a calculation of the traffic level along a segment of roadway for any average day of the year. In 2010, INDOT figured that lowest traffic levels were 1,170 vehicles and 40 commercial vehicles used the highway daily at the Franklin–Fayette County line. The peak traffic volumes were 9,470 vehicles and 260 commercial vehicles AADT along the section of SR 121 that is concurrent with SR 227, on North J Street in Richmond.

Southern segment
The southern segment of SR 121 begins at US 52 and heads north as a rural two-lane curvy highway. The highway passes through most farmland and enters the town of Laurel, making a few sharp curves. The route passes through residential properties through town and makes another set of sharp curves leaving town. The highway heads northeast towards Connersville, on the way passing through farmland. The route enters Connersville from the southwest concurrent with Grand Avenue. The highway passes through residential and commercial properties, before ending at SR 44.

Northern segment
The northern segment of SR 121 begins at an intersection between US 27 and SR 227, just north of downtown Richmond. SR 121 heads east concurrent with SR 227, on North J Street. The two state roads leaves J Street for Middleboro Pike and heads northeast. The concurrent with SR 227 ends when SR 121 turns east onto New Paris Pike. The highway heads mostly east towards New Paris, Ohio and crosses over Interstate 70 on the way. SR 121 ends at the Ohio state line and becomes Ohio State Route 121.

History
SR 121 was commissioned in 1931 routed between Richmond and the Ohio state line. In 1932 a second segment was added to the state road system routed between US 52 and Connersville. The northern segment at the time of commissioning was a hard driving surface and the southern segment was a dirt driving surface. Between 1966 and 1967 the southern segment of SR 121 within Fayette County was paved. By 1970 the rest of SR 121, the section within Franklin County, was paved.

Major intersections

References

External links

Indiana Highway Ends - SR 121

121
Transportation in Fayette County, Indiana
Transportation in Franklin County, Indiana
Transportation in Wayne County, Indiana